VTES 3rd Edition (Third) is a complete base set for White Wolf's trading card game Vampire: The Eternal Struggle released on 4 September 2006.  White Wolf's page dedicated to the set indicates the reasoning for calling it the third edition: "White Wolf's eleventh expansion for Vampire: The Eternal Struggle is a stand-alone base set. It is called Third Edition (after the Camarilla Edition, which is reckoned as the second edition)."  The expansion also happens to be the third set based on the Sabbat sect. It contained a whole new set of vampires, but mainly reprints of library cards. Due to insufficient quality management the distribution of the cards in the boosters and the overall printing quality was significantly worse than in previous expansions. In addition the card backs are printed upside-down (in comparison to all other expansions). De facto it is now required to use card sleeves in tournaments when a player uses cards from the 3rd Edition set mixed with cards from other expansions. These flaws caused some resentment towards the 3rd Edition set in the player community. Nonetheless, the expansion won the InQuest Gamer 2007 Fan Awards for best trading card expansion.

Contents
Part of the expansion are 4 different pre-constructed decks with 89 cards each as well as boosters with 11 cards each (5 common, 3 vampire, 2 uncommon and 1 rare). There is a total of 390 cards in this set, of which 136 cards are new, i.e. 10 new common, 10 uncommon, 10 rare cards, 6 fixed cards (from the starters) and 100 vampire cards; the rest of the 254 library cards are actually reprints from older sets. The pre-constructed decks are:
 Brujah antitribu
 Malkavian antritribu
 Tremere antitribu
 Tzimisce
The vampires White Lily and Duality (also included in this set) were given as promo cards in a number of magazines. 
Simultaneously White Wolf released a players kit which contained half of each of the four pre-constructed starters as well as counters and an extensive example of play.

Mechanics
 Draft Effects—a number of library cards contain a draft effect, that the card can be played during a draft format game, usually with a lesser effect and other requirements that the base version of the card.
 Trifles—It is now allowed to play a second trifle master card if the first master card played was also a trifle. Before this the second master card couldn't be a trifle master card.

Cards
 Heart of Nizchetus—an equipment card which provides a very good card drawing/replacement ability that does not waste the currently unwanted cards.
 Helicopter—an equipment card which allows a minion to untap once each turn after a successful action, similar to the Freak Drive card.
 Mirror Walk—an action modifier requiring the Thaumaturgy discipline which gives stealth to a minion's action, while denying any combat if the action is blocked.
 Wash—a master out-of-turn card which allows to counter a master card played by another player. Due to the trifle property of Wash the player is still allowed to play a master card by himself in his own master phase next turn.
 Yawp Court—a master card which allows a Sabbat vampire to block a political action without regard to the stealth/intercept ratio.

External links
 Checklist for the expansion
 The official site

References

Vampire: The Masquerade
Collectible card games